Shanghai Nanhui Senior High School (上海南汇中学) is a senior high school in Pudong District, Shanghai.

References

External links
 Shanghai Nanhui Senior High School 

High schools in Shanghai
Pudong